Hamar arch-deanery is a deanery in the Diocese of Hamar which is part of the Church of Norway. This arch-deanery covers several municipalities in the central part of the diocese. It includes the municipalities of Hamar, Løten, and Stange. The arch-deanery is headquartered at the Hamar Cathedral in the city of Hamar in Hamar Municipality.

History
Prior to the protestant reformation in Norway, the Ancient Diocese of Hamar oversaw this part of the Kingdom. After the reformation, the old diocese was closed down and merged into another diocese. The re-creation of the Diocese of Hamar was initiated with a Royal Resolution dated February 27, 1864, effective October 1, 1864. All of the old deaneries were continued on in the new diocese. Also on October 1, 1864 the old Hedemarken prosti was divided in two: Hamar arch-deanery and Hedemarken prosti. The new Hamar arch-deanery consisted of the Vang Church prestegjeld and the parish priest at Vang Church also was named the dean of the deanery. On May 1, 1908, the newly established parishes of Furnes and Hamar also became part of the Hamar arch-deanery (in addition to the Vang parish). On January 1, 1972, Hedemarken prosti was abolished and incorporated into the Hamar arch-deanery. In 2007, all the parishes in Ringsaker municipality were transferred out of the Hamar arch-deanery and into the newly created Ringsaker prosti that was based in Moelv at Ringsaker Church.

Churches
The arch-deanery includes many churches and chapels in the three municipalities. Each municipality makes up a clerical district which in turn is divided into one or more parishes. There is at least one church for each parish. In addition, there are chapels at Hamar Hospital, Hamar Prison, and Ilseng Prison which are part of the Hamar arch-deanery.

Priests 
The following parish priests for Vang Church were also the deanery priests.

1846-1876: Paul Vinsnes
1876-1887: Arnoldus Marius Hille
1888-1889: Oluf Saxe
1890-1908: David Christopher Frich 
1908-1917: Hans Emil Erichsen 
1917-1922: Mikkel Bjønness-Jacobsen
1922-1931: Olaf Riddervold-Olsen 
1931-1939: Jørgen Thronsen 
1940-1949: Sverre Jervell 
1950-1963: Hans Finstad 
1963-1972: Anders Aschim 
1972-1980: Herman Kvarving 
1980-1985: Christian Martin Myhre-Nielsen 
1985-1997: Nils Kristian Lie
1997-2012: Ole Elias Holck
2012-2020: Leif Jørn Hvidsten
2020-present: Kirsten Almås

References

Deaneries in Hamar Diocese